Peace Pipe is the fifth album by bassist Ben Allison. It was released on the Palmetto Records label in 2002 and features Malian kora virtuoso Mamadou Diabaté.

Track list
All compositions by Ben Allison, except where noted.

 Third Rail
 Slap Happy
 Peace Pipe
 Dakan (Mamadou Diabaté)
 Goin' Back (Neil Young)
 Disposable Genius
 Music is Music
 Realization
 Mantra

Personnel
 Ben Allison – Bass, Guitar
 Mamadou Diabaté – Kora
 Michael Blake – Saxophones
 Frank Kimbrough – Piano
 Mike Sarin – Drums
 Peter Apfelbaum – Saxophones
 Tomas Ulrich – Cello

References

External links
 benallison.com - Peace Pipe

2002 albums
Ben Allison albums
Palmetto Records albums